Melanie Batkowski (born 11 February 1989) is an Austrian luger who has competed since 2004. A natural track luger, she won five medals at the FIL World Luge Natural Track Championships with two golds (Mixed team: 2005, 2007), two silvers (Mixed team: 2009, 2011), and a bronze (Women's singles: 2007).

Batkowski also won gold in the mixed team event at the FIL European Luge Natural Track Championships 2010 in St. Sebastian, Austria.

References
FIL-Luge profile
Natural track World Championships results: 1979-2007

External links

 

1989 births
Living people
Austrian female lugers
20th-century Austrian women
21st-century Austrian women